Marten Eikelboom (born 12 October 1973 in Zwolle) is a field hockey striker from the Netherlands, who was a member of the Dutch team that won the gold medal at the 2000 Summer Olympics in Sydney. After the World Hockey Cup in Kuala Lumpur (2002) he retired from the national squad, but in 2004 he made a comeback, just because of the 2004 Summer Olympics in Athens, where he finished second.

Eikelboom played 177 international matches for the Dutch, in which he scored a total number of 58 goals. He made his debut on 5 June 1994 in a friendly against New Zealand. In the Dutch League he played for Hattem and Amsterdam, with whom he won the title four times.

External links

 Dutch Hockey Federation

1973 births
Living people
Dutch male field hockey players
Male field hockey forwards
Olympic field hockey players of the Netherlands
Olympic gold medalists for the Netherlands
Olympic silver medalists for the Netherlands
Field hockey players at the 2000 Summer Olympics
2002 Men's Hockey World Cup players
Field hockey players at the 2004 Summer Olympics
Sportspeople from Zwolle
Olympic medalists in field hockey
Medalists at the 2004 Summer Olympics
Medalists at the 2000 Summer Olympics
Amsterdamsche Hockey & Bandy Club players
20th-century Dutch people
21st-century Dutch people